The FIFA Youth Tournament Under-18 1953 Final Tournament was held in Belgium. Argentina was the first non-European team that entered.

Teams
The following teams entered the tournament:

  (invited)
 
  (host)

First round

Quarterfinals

Places 9-16

Places 1-8

Semifinals

Places 13-16

Places 9-12

Places 5-8

Places 1-4

Final Matches

Fifteenth Place Match

Thirteenth Place Match

Eleventh Place Match

Ninth Place Match

Seventh-place match

Fifth-place match

Third place match

Final

External links
Results by RSSSF

UEFA European Under-19 Championship
1953
Under-18
Under
Under-18
March 1953 sports events in Europe
April 1953 sports events in Europe
1953 in youth association football